Hohenbergia correia-araujoi is a plant species in the genus Hohenbergia. This species is endemic to Brazil.

Cultivars
 × Hohenmea 'Betsy McCrory'

References

BSI Cultivar Registry Retrieved 11 October 2009

correia-araujoi
Flora of Brazil
Plants described in 1980